Nicky Catsburg (born 15 February 1988 in Amersfoort) is a Dutch professional racing driver, for BMW and General Motors works driver for Corvette Racing.

Career

2016 
2nd Daytona 24 Hours 
2nd WTCC Moscow Opening Race 
1st WTCC Moscow Main Race 
2015

Winner Spa 24 Hours with BMW Sports Trophy Team MarcVDS
2014
Winner VLN3 with BMW Sports Trophy Team MarcVDS 
Winner Paul Ricard Blancpain Endurance Series Pro - Am with TDS Racing Team 
Winner Nurburgring Blancpain Endurance Series Pro - Am with TDS Racing Team
Winner and p2 Nurburgring GT Open with Selleslagh Racing Team
Vice Champion Pro - Am team championship Blancpain Endurance Series with TDS Racing Team.
Participation 24h Nurburgring with BMW Sports Trophy Team MarcVDS 
Participation VLN6 in Dorr Mclaren
Participation GT Tour - Magny Cours & Paul Ricard
Participation BRCC championship with Lamborghini Gallardo GT3
Development on Renault RS.0.1 for Renault Sport Technologies

2013
Winner Team Championship Blancpain Endurance Series with MarcVDS Racing Team. Sharing with Markus Palttala and Henri Moser in BMW Z4 GT3 
Participation 24h Spa in BMW Z4 GT3 
Winner VLN8 in Z4 GT3 sharing with Maxime Martin 
Podium in ELMS at the Redbull Ring with Algarve Pro Racing Team in LMPC Class. 
Participation ELMS Hungaroring LMPC Class 
Test driver Algarve Pro Racing Team in an LMPC

2012
3rd place Dutch GT Championship for Ekris Motorsport, several race wins in the BMW M3 GT4 
Participation 24h Zolder, Blancpain Endurance Series Navarra for MarcVDS Racing Team in a BMW Z4 GT3 
Participation 24h Spa for Team RaceArt in an BMW Z4 GT3

2011
GT1 Abu Dhabi, Sachsenring, Zolder in Corvette GT1 for Exim Bank Team China (Selleslagh Racing team). Sharing car with Mike Hezemans. 
GT1, rest of the season for Sumopower in Nissan GT1 sharing with Enrique Bernoldi. 
FIA GT3 season in BMW Z4 GT3 for DB Motorsport, several podiums. 
Test & development driver for Nissan GT-R GT3.

2010 
European Megane Trophy Champion
 
2009
10th in Megane Trophy, several podiums in Dutch GT4

2008 
8th in FR 2.0 NEC, podium in Spa. Podium 24H Barcelona
 
2007
6th in FR 2.0 NEC. Participation 24H Barcelona
 
2006
Dutch Formula Ford Champion/ Benelux Formula Ford Champion. Participation 24h Dubai and Barcelona
 
2005
Vice Champion Seat Cupra Cup

Racing record

Complete GT1 World Championship results

Complete FIA GT Series results

‡ As Catsburg was a guest driver, he was ineligible for championship points.

Complete Blancpain GT Series Sprint Cup results

Complete World Touring Car Championship results
(key) (Races in bold indicate pole position) (Races in italics indicate fastest lap)

‡ Half points awarded as less than 75% of race distance was completed.

Complete IMSA SportsCar Championship results
(key) (Races in bold indicate pole position; races in italics indicate fastest lap)

* Season still in progress.

Complete FIA World Endurance Championship results
(key) (Races in bold indicate pole position; races in italics indicate fastest lap)

Complete 24 Hours of Le Mans results

Complete World Touring Car Cup results
(key) (Races in bold indicate pole position) (Races in italics indicate fastest lap)

‡ As Catsburg was a Wildcard entry, he was ineligible to score points.

Complete Supercar Challenge results

References

External links
 
 
 

1988 births
Living people
Sportspeople from Amersfoort
Dutch racing drivers
Formula Renault 2.0 NEC drivers
FIA GT Championship drivers
Eurocup Mégane Trophy drivers
Formula Ford drivers
FIA GT1 World Championship drivers
Blancpain Endurance Series drivers
International GT Open drivers
24 Hours of Spa drivers
World Touring Car Championship drivers
WeatherTech SportsCar Championship drivers
24 Hours of Daytona drivers
24 Hours of Le Mans drivers
FIA World Endurance Championship drivers
World Touring Car Cup drivers
MP Motorsport drivers
BMW M drivers
TDS Racing drivers
European Le Mans Series drivers
Rowe Racing drivers
Rahal Letterman Lanigan Racing drivers
Corvette Racing drivers
Mercedes-AMG Motorsport drivers
Tech 1 Racing drivers
Schnitzer Motorsport drivers
Nürburgring 24 Hours drivers
Hyundai Motorsport drivers
Asian Le Mans Series drivers
Engstler Motorsport drivers
Craft-Bamboo Racing drivers